Glenn A. Baker  (born 28 July 1952) is an Australian journalist, commentator, author, and broadcaster well known in Australia for his vast knowledge of Rock music. He has written books and magazine articles on rock music and travel, interviewed celebrities, managed bands such as Ol' 55 and promoted tours of international stars. In the mid-1980s, Baker took the BBC's "Rock Brain of the Universe" crown three times. Baker was the Australian editor of Billboard for over 20 years. He won the inaugural Australian Travel Writer of the Year award in 1995 from the Australian Society of Travel Writers, and he won the award again in 2000.

Biography
Glenn A. Baker was born in 1952, the eldest of four children to Joyce Baker and grew up in Coogee until he was nine; when the Bakers relocated to Canberra. His younger brother, Johnny, drowned in an accident in the following year and his parents separated not long after. He moved about NSW, attending 12 schools in 10 years.

While working for the Department of the Media, where he worked on the research project that led to the establishment of 2JJ, Baker met Geoff Plummer, who was a drummer for a 1950s retro band, Fanis. Baker saw them perform in 1975 and became their manager, changing their name to Ol' 55 after the Tom Waits song. Baker's management was astute and presented the group as a combination of retro kitsch, rock music and clever theatrics. Baker introduced chartered accountant Peter Brian to the band, and he became their versatile front man Frankie J. Holden; in October, Baker recruited saxophone player Nick Aitken, who performed as Wilbur Wilde. Ol' 55 had hit singles with "On the Prowl", "Looking for an Echo" and the number one "(I Want A) Rockin' Christmas" (which Baker co-wrote, as he did "C'mon Let's Do It") and a No. 2 triple platinum debut album, Take It Greasy. Both Holden and Wilde had careers in television after Ol' 55. During 1976–1978 Baker also managed Punkz, which he moulded into the pop group Cheek, who had national chart success with "So Much in Love".

Raven Records is an Australian label established in 1979 by Baker, Kevin Mueller and Peter Shillito, specialising in reissues and retrospectives. Baker's radio career started by hosting a music trivia program on Sydney radio station 2JJ (soon to become Triple J) and moved on to the Triple M network. In the mid-1980s, Baker took the BBC's "Rock Brain of the Universe" crown three times.

Specializing in music and travel writing, Baker has authored 16 books, written for more than 200 magazines and annotated over 500 music albums, as well as acting as a consultant on various music-related projects. He has also co-written music for films and is an active television/radio presenter and public speaker, appearing regularly on The Today Show, Mornings With Kerri-Anne, 20 to 1 and on the Ovation Channel. He has been heard as an in-flight presenter on Qantas for more than two decades. Baker won the inaugural Australian Travel Writer of the Year award in 1995, from the Australian Society of Travel Writers, and won the award again in 2000. He has visited more than 100 countries. He resides in the Hills District and is the father of five sons and a daughter. He and his wife Lorelle divorced in mid 2009. His second son Rudi Baker is an accomplished actor, having appeared in numerous Australian feature films (such as Dirty Deeds) and television series, including the role of regular cast member Quentin Richards on ABC TV's Love Is a Four Letter Word.

Baker is a member of the Australian Recording Industry Association (ARIA) Hall of Fame Advisory Committee. On 1 July 2008, Baker inducted New Zealand-born blues/rock and roll veteran, Max Merritt, into the Hall of Fame, having previously inducted Australian Crawl, The Masters Apprentices and Billy Thorpe. September 2010 saw the simultaneous release of two books – Best of Baker: Music and Best of Baker: Travel.

Bibliography
Baker has written, co-written or edited the following:

References

External links
 Glenn A Baker at Global Travel Writers

1952 births
Living people
Journalists from Sydney
Australian music journalists
Triple J announcers
Members of the Order of Australia